Mimacraea costleyi is a butterfly in the family Lycaenidae first described by Hamilton Herbert Druce in 1912. It is found in Malawi.

References

Butterflies described in 1912
Poritiinae
Endemic fauna of Malawi
Butterflies of Africa